Cañas River, also known as Río Cañas (English: Canas River), is a river in the municipality of Ponce, Puerto Rico. It is also known as Río Magueyes in the area where it flows through Barrio Magueyes, also in the municipality of Ponce. This river is one of the 14 rivers in the municipality.

Origin
The river originates in Cerro Avispa, located in Barrio Guaraguao, near Guaraguao's boundary with the municipality of Adjuntas, and runs south towards the Caribbean Sea. The old Hacienda Buena Vista plantation in barrio Magueyes, now a coffee mill museum, used the force of Cañas River in the early 20th century to turn its coffee bean grinders via an elaborate system of water channels.

Course
The river runs in a southerly direction parallel to Puerto Rico route PR-123, the old road from Adjuntas to Ponce.  Continuing south and running parallel to Route 123, the river enters the city of Ponce in the area of barrio Magueyes Urbano (the urban zone of barrio Magueyes) before approaching PR-132, the country road from Ponce to Peñuelas. This area of PR-132 is known as Calle Villa Final, and the river crosses Calle Villa Final immediately east of the entrance to Urbanizacion Jardines del Caribe from Calle Villa Final.  The river then runs parallel to Jardines del Caribe's East Main Street, and crosses Avenida Las Americas (PR-163), next to the intersection of PR-163 and PR-500. Continuing south, Río Cañas merges with Río Pastillo, as it approaches Calle Baramaya behind Urbanizacion Río Cañas, to become Río Matilde.  Less than one mile further south Río Matilde empties into the Caribbean Sea at barrio Playa.

The Government of Puerto Rico plans to canalize this river.

The following table summarizes the course of Rio Canas in terms of roads crossed. Roads are listed as the river flows from its origin in Cerro Avispa, in Barrio Guaraguao, north of the city of Ponce, until the river feeds into Rio Matilde in Barrio Canas in the south (N/A = Data not available):

*Marker requires field verification.

Surrounding geology
The southern end of Río Cañas is known to be surrounded by significant amounts of limestone. This area made the ideal place for the location of a cement factory, and Ponce Cement was built near Río Cañas.

Fish life
In 2008, a study was made to determine fish life in Rio Cañas. The study found that at 5.6 km NNW of Ponce the river runs at an elevation of 220.8m; at 5.0 km NNW of Ponce it runs at an elevation of 164.2m; at 3.1 km NW of Ponce it runs at an elevation of 57.7m; and at 2.0 km NW of Ponce it runs at an elevation of 30.0m.

See also

 List of rivers of Puerto Rico
 List of rivers of Ponce

References

External links
 USGS Geographic Names Information Service

Rivers of Puerto Rico
Rivers of Ponce, Puerto Rico
Barrio Guaraguao